Albayan University (Arabic:جامعة البيان) is a university in Baghdad, Iraq.

Colleges
 College of Dentistry
 College of Pharmacy
 College of Pathological Techniques Analysis 
 College of Nursing
 College of Law
 College of Business Administrations

References

External links
Official website 
Official website 

Baghdad
Educational institutions established in the 13th century
Education in Baghdad
2016 establishments in Asia
2016 establishments in Iraq